Dimitris Fosses (Greek: Δημήτρης Φωσσές; born November 14, 1952 in Greece) is a Greek retired professional basketball player and coach. At 6'6 " (2.00 m) in height, he played at the power forward and center positions.

Professional club playing career
In the top-tier level Greek League, Fosses played in 408 games, and scored a total of 6,809 points, which is the 7th most total points scored in the competition, since the 1963–64 season.

National team playing career
Fosses played in 55 games with the senior men's Greek national basketball team. With Greece, he played at the 1972 European Olympic Qualification tournament, and at EuroBasket 1975.

Coaching career
After he retired from playing professional basketball, Fosses worked as a basketball coach.

Awards and accomplishments
7th all-time leading scorer of the Greek Basketball Championship, with 6,809 total points scored in the Greek A National League (1963–64 season to present).

References

External links 
FIBA Profile
Hellenic Basketball Federation Player Profile 
Τα “κανόνια” του ελληνικού Πρωταθλήματος: Δημήτρης Φωσσές 

1952 births
Living people
Centers (basketball)
Dafnis B.C. players
Greek basketball coaches
Greek Basket League players
Greek men's basketball players
Maroussi B.C. players
Near East B.C. players
Panionios B.C. players
Power forwards (basketball)
Basketball players from Athens